The University of Central Missouri (UCM) is a public university in Warrensburg, Missouri. In 2019, enrollment was 11,229 students from 49 states and 59 countries on its 1,561-acre campus. UCM offers 150 programs of study, including 10 pre-professional programs, 27 areas of teacher certification, and 37 graduate programs.

History
The University was founded in 1871 as Normal School No. 2 and became known as Warrensburg Teachers College. The name was changed to Central Missouri State Teachers College in 1919, Central Missouri State College in 1945 and Central Missouri State University in 1972. In 1965, the institution established a graduate school. In 2006, the name was changed to the University of Central Missouri. There are 150 majors and minors, 32 professional accreditations and 37 graduate programs. UCM has a high-tech, STEM-focused facility called the Missouri Innovation Campus in Lee's Summit, Missouri and provides numerous online courses and programs.

Academics
College of Arts, Humanities, and Social Sciences:
UCM students take College of Arts, Humanities, and Social Sciences courses that develop critical-thinking, writing, and speaking skills. Accreditations include National Association of Schools of Music and National Council for Social Studies. Departments include:
School of Visual and Performing Arts 
Music
Theatre and Dance
Art and Design
Government, International Studies and Languages
Political Science
English and Philosophy
History and Anthropology
Communication and Sociology
Religious Studies
Women's Studies

Harmon College of Business and Professional Studies:
The Harmon College of Business and Professional Studies is accredited by AACSB International. Other accreditations include Aviation Accreditation Board International and the Council on Social Work Education. Departments include:
School of Business Administration
Economics, Finance and Marketing
School of Accountancy and Computer Information Systems
Management
School of Professional Studies
Aviation
Criminal Justice
Communication Disorders and Social Work
Military Science and Leadership

College of Education:
UCM's College of Education prepares students to become teachers. Departments include: 
Career and Technology Education
Educational Leadership and Human Development
Educational Foundations and Literacy 
Elementary and Early Childhood Education

College of Health, Science, and Technology:
Combining scientific theory and applied technology, the College of Health, Science, and Technology includes: 
School of Health and Human Performance
Nursing
Nutrition and Kinesiology
Biology and Earth Science
School of Environmental, Physical, and Applied Sciences
School of Technology
School of Computer Science and Mathematics
Psychological Science.

The Honors College:
First-time incoming freshmen must have a minimum ACT score of 25 (or SAT equivalent) and a minimum cumulative high school GPA of 3.5 to be considered for admission to The Honors College. Once incoming freshmen have completed a semester at UCM as a full-time student and have a college cumulative GPA of 3.5 or higher, they may apply to The Honors College. Current UCM students or students transferring to UCM must have achieved a minimum cumulative college GPA of 3.5 or higher. Benefits of being an Honors College student include, but are not limited to, early enrollment, one-on-one advising, smaller classes, Honors-only courses and colloquia.

GIMPS 
The University of Central Missouri continues to hold an important role in the Great Internet Mersenne Prime Search. The GIMPS project at UCM is a university-wide effort managed by Curtis Cooper and Steven Boone. As of 2022, UCM's team is currently the 10th place contributor to that project in terms of CPU power devoted to the project, and is the only GIMPS team that has discovered four Mersenne primes: M43 230402457 - 1 with 9,152,052 digits, M44 232582657 - 1 with 9,808,358 digits, M48 257,885,161-1 with 17,425,170 digits, and M49 274,207,281-1 with 22,338,618 digits.

Student life
The university has more than 200 student organizations with academic, cultural, recreational, community service and special interest clubs and associations. There are also more than 20 intramural sports to compete in, free movie nights on campus and a bowling alley and movie theater in the student union. Freshman and sophomore students are required to live in one of the 16 residence halls their first year to help ease the adjustment from high school to college. Students can also choose to live in a Special Housing Interest Program, which places students with the same program of study together in the residence halls.

Greek life
The University of Central Missouri is home to 26 Greek organizations; recruitment takes place in both the spring and fall semesters. Eleven percent of UCM students are involved in Greek life. A Greek program, Greeks Advocating Mature Management of Alcohol known as GAMMA, promotes alcohol awareness. It assisted the Student Government Association with bringing the Night Ryder bus to campus. Night Ryder provides students a free ride to and from campus to ensure that students have safe transportation. A list are of fraternity and sorority chapters are presented below.

Fraternities
Alpha Phi Alpha
Alpha Kappa Lambda
Alpha Tau Omega
Delta Chi
FarmHouse
Lambda Chi Alpha
Omega Psi Phi
Phi Beta Sigma
Phi Sigma Kappa
Phi Sigma Pi
Sigma Phi Epsilon
Sigma Pi
Sigma Tau Gamma
Tau Kappa Epsilon
Theta Chi

Sororities
Alpha Kappa Alpha
Alpha Gamma Delta
Alpha Omicron Pi
Alpha Phi
Alpha Sigma Alpha
Delta Sigma Theta
Delta Zeta
Gamma Phi Beta
Sigma Kappa
Sigma Sigma Sigma
Sigma Gamma Rho
Zeta Phi Beta

Media
UCM produces a newspaper focusing on the campus called The Muleskinner and an online publication called digitalburg.com that covers the Johnson County area. Even though these publications are overseen by a faculty advisor, they are entirely student operated and accept article submissions from any student. The university also houses KMOS-TV.

Athletics

UCM athletic teams compete in the Mid–America Intercollegiate Athletics Association, or MIAA. The athletic division includes basketball, baseball, women's bowling, American football, golf, women's soccer, softball, cross-country, track, volleyball and wrestling. UCM's athletic teams are called Mules (men) and Jennies (women). UCM has two mascots, Mo the Mule and a live mule named Mancow.

Basketball games are played in the UCM Multipurpose Building.  Built in 1976, The Multi, as it is known to students and alumni, has a seating capacity of 6,500 for basketball and volleyball games. Football games are played on Vernon Kennedy Field at Audrey J. Walton Stadium. The stadium was erected in 1928 and underwent a major face-lift in 1995. The stadium officially holds 11,000 people, but crowds often approach 12,000.

Keth Memorial Golf Course within Pertle Springs Park on the campus of the University of Central Missouri is an 18-hole grass greens course complete with a fully equipped pro shop.  In 2015 a $1.2 million renovation was completed that included a new driving range, new practice putting and chipping greens, and a new pro shop. Keth Memorial also is home for UCM golf and cross country competitions.

Library
The James C. Kirkpatrick Library (JCKL) is the library of the University of Central Missouri. At the Library dedication on March 24, 1999, the then Governor of Missouri, Mel Carnahan, was present and gave the keynote address. It was named for former Secretary of State, James C. Kirkpatrick, who was the longest serving Secretary of State in Missouri from 1965 to 1985. Upon retirement, his office was moved from the Missouri State Capitol to Ward Edwards Library, the previous University of Central Missouri library building. It is now located in the James C. Kirkpatrick Library. There are over 480,000 circulating volumes. 
The Ophelia Gilbert Room provides exhibit space for the Philip A. Sadler Research Collection of Literature for Children and Young Adults and General Special Collections. The room is named for Ophelia Gilbert, a longtime University of Central Missouri faculty member, children's librarian, and co-founder, with Philip Sadler, of the Children's Literature Festival at the University of Central Missouri.

The McClure Archives and University Museum, Learning Commons, and Digital Learning and Instructional Innovation are also located in the building. Also located in the James C. Kirkpatrick Library is the Einstein Bros. Café, which is situated on the ground floor along with a grand piano once owned by Clyde Robert Bulla, who had a long association with the Children's Literature Festival.

Notable alumni and faculty

References

External links

 
 Central Missouri Athletics website
 

 
University of Central
University of Central Missouri
Educational institutions established in 1871
Buildings and structures in Johnson County, Missouri
Education in Johnson County, Missouri
1871 establishments in Missouri